Leptozestis is a genus of moths in the family Cosmopterigidae.

Species
Leptozestis anagrapta (Meyrick, 1897)
Leptozestis antithetis (Meyrick, 1897) 
Leptozestis argoscia (Lower, 1904)
Leptozestis autochroa (Meyrick, 1915)
Leptozestis capnopora (Meyrick, 1897)
Leptozestis cataspoda (Meyrick, 1897)
Leptozestis charmosyna (Meyrick, 1921)
Leptozestis chionomera  
Leptozestis crassipalpis (Turner, 1923)
Leptozestis crebra (Meyrick, 1906)
Leptozestis cyclonia (Meyrick, 1897)
Leptozestis decalopha (Lower, 1904) 
Leptozestis ecstatica (Meyrick, 1897)
Leptozestis epiphrixa (Meyrick, 1897)
Leptozestis epochaea 
Leptozestis euryplaca (Lower, 1893)
Leptozestis eximia (Meyrick, 1897)
Leptozestis gnophodes (Lower, 1904) 
Leptozestis harmosta (Meyrick, 1897)
Leptozestis hestiopa (Meyrick, 1897) 
Leptozestis melamydra  
Leptozestis melanopa (Meyrick, 1897)
Leptozestis ochlopa (Meyrick, 1897)
Leptozestis oxyptera  
Leptozestis parasica (Meyrick, 1897)
Leptozestis perinephes  
Leptozestis phylactis (Meyrick, 1897) (misspelling Leptozestis plylactis)
Leptozestis polychroa  
Leptozestis psarotricha (Meyrick, 1897)
Leptozestis psoralea (Meyrick, 1897) 
Leptozestis sedula (Meyrick, 1897) 
Leptozestis spodoptera (Turner, 1923)
Leptozestis strophicodes (Meyrick, 1917)
Leptozestis tephras (Meyrick, 1897)
Leptozestis toreutica (Meyrick, 1897)
Leptozestis tropaea (Meyrick, 1897)
Leptozestis valida (Meyrick, 1919)

Former species
Leptozestis acrocyrta  
Leptozestis acromianta 
Leptozestis chalcoptila (Meyrick, 1922) 
Leptozestis fumea  
Leptozestis macrostola  
Leptozestis pygaea  
Leptozestis tephronota  
Leptozestis xenonympha

References
Natural History Museum Lepidoptera genus database

Cosmopteriginae
Moth genera